A police foundation is a charitable organization with the aim of improving policing. 

In many cities, counties and states throughout the United States, local charitable organizations or "police foundations" have been created. Police foundations—nonprofit organizations that help raise money and provide resources for police programs, equipment, and special needs that cannot be readily provided through public sector funds—offer a promising source of support in bridging funding gaps. This often includes support for specialized training and equipment that is important for citizen and officer safety, including body armor and support for community programs associated with public safety, such as youth Police Explorer programs. In 2010, it was estimated that at least 25 local police foundations existed, although nearly 100 are listed below.  These foundations have proved controversial in some locations.

In the United States, the Police Foundation (also known as the National Police Foundation) operates at a national level but does not operate in the same way as local police foundations and has no affiliation with local foundations. Instead, the National Police Foundation conducts and translates scientific research, training, technical assistance and evaluation to advance policing. In the United Kingdom, the Police Foundation (UK) describes itself as "the UK's policing think tank".

In 2011, the U.S. Department of Justice's Office of Community Oriented Policing Services (COPS Office) partnered with the Target Corporation to hold a series of training workshops around the U.S. to "provide business leaders, elected officials, police chiefs, and foundation board members and staff with the basic tools to establish and grow a police foundation". These workshops were conducted by representatives of the New York City Police Foundation.

List
A listing of local police foundations is provided below:

See also
 Police academy
 Police
 Law enforcement agency
National Police Foundation

References

Foundations based in the United States
Law enforcement in the United States
Charities based in the United States
Police culture